Emile Abraham (born 28 April 1974) is a professional cyclist from Trinidad and Tobago. He won the silver medal in the men's individual road race at the 2007 Pan American Games, just behind Dominican Republic's Wendy Cruz. In 2017 he won the USA Masters National road cycling championships and a bronze medal in the Masters World Track Championships in the points race in Los Angeles.

Some of Emile Abraham's main achievements are

 2nd place overall USAC National Criterium ranking 2016
 8th Pan American Games Toronto 2015
 12X National Road champion
 2X National Time Trial Champion
 Tour de Quebec Champion 2013
 Tour of Trinidad and Tobago Champion 2013
 Silver medal Caribbean Championship 2013 & 2014
 Silver Medal Central American and Caribbean Games – Puerto Rico 2010
 Bronze Medal B World Championships – Switzerland 2003
 10th place Philadelphia Cycling Classic UCI HC 2008
 6th Stage 3 Tour de Georgia UCI HC 2008
 7th Stages 1 & 6 Herald Sun Tour UCI HC 2008
 Sportsman of the year T&T by the TTOC 2007
 7X Champion Tobago International Cycling Classic

References

 http://www.fcsportsfoundation.com/athletes/emile-abraham/

1974 births
Living people
Trinidad and Tobago male cyclists
Cyclists at the 2007 Pan American Games
Cyclists at the 2011 Pan American Games
Cyclists at the 2010 Commonwealth Games
Pan American Games silver medalists for Trinidad and Tobago
Pan American Games medalists in cycling
Cyclists at the 2015 Pan American Games
Medalists at the 2007 Pan American Games
Commonwealth Games competitors for Trinidad and Tobago
Competitors at the 2006 Central American and Caribbean Games
Competitors at the 2010 Central American and Caribbean Games